The land of Goshen is the Hebrew name of an area in the Nile delta in Ancient Egypt.

Goshen may also refer to:

Places

United States

Cities and towns
Goshen, Alabama
Goshen, Arkansas
Goshen, California
Goshen, Connecticut
Goshen, Georgia
Goshen, Idaho
Goshen, Indiana
Goshen College, a Mennonite college
Goshen, Kentucky
Goshen, Massachusetts
Goshen, Missouri
Goshen, New Hampshire
Goshen, New Jersey
Goshen, New York, a town
Goshen (village), New York, in the town of Goshen
Goshen, Ohio, in Clermont County
Goshen, Tuscarawas County, Ohio
Goshen, Oregon
Goshen, Texas (disambiguation), multiple uses
Goshen, Utah
Goshen Reservoir
Goshen Valley
Goshen, Vermont
Goshen, Virginia
Goshen Scout Reservation, a Boy Scout reservation
Goshen, Washington
Goshen, West Virginia

Other places
Goshen Avenue, a street in Visalia, California
Goshen County, Wyoming
Goshen Road, an early road across Illinois
Goshen Settlement, a historical area in Illinois
Goshen Township (disambiguation)

Elsewhere
Goshen, Tasmania, Australia, a locality
Goshen, Nova Scotia, Canada, a rural community
State of Goshen, South Africa, a short-lived Boer republic

Other uses
Goshen Coach, a small bus manufacturer in Elkhart, Indiana

See also
Goshen point, a Paleo-Indian projectile point
Goschen (disambiguation)